Breviea is a genus of plant in the family Sapotaceae described  in 1935.

It contains only one known species, Breviea sericea native to tropical Africa (Ghana, Ivory Coast, Central African Republic, Cameroon, Zaire).

The species is listed as near threatened.

References

 
Monotypic Ericales genera
Sapotaceae genera
Flora of Africa
Near threatened plants
Taxonomy articles created by Polbot
Taxa named by François Pellegrin
Taxa named by André Aubréville